Fusarium affine is a fungal plant pathogen affecting tobacco.

See also
 List of tobacco diseases

References

External links

affine
Fungal plant pathogens and diseases
Tobacco diseases